Julia McNamara (née Noughton) is a fictional character in the American television series Nip/Tuck, portrayed by Joely Richardson.

Character history
Julia is Sean McNamara's wife of 17 years, with the couple divorcing for the last time in Season 4. She has three children: Matt McNamara, Annie McNamara and Connor.

Season One
Housewife Julia McNamara's life is already in freefall, dissatisfied with her marriage to plastic surgeon, Sean McNamara, and in love with his partner, Christian Troy, with whom she had a one-night stand in college. Due to her unhappiness; Julia flushes her daughter Annie's gerbil down the toilet, and tries to instigate an affair with Christian. Julia returns to college in an effort to finish her doctorate and meets a fellow student, named Jude. Julia discovers his attraction to her and uses it to make Sean jealous. Their friendship ends when Julia discovers that Jude is a professional gigolo who targets middle-aged housewives. Julia drops out of college and later rallies against her housewife friends when they try and bar Sofia Lopez, a trans woman, from their women-only gym. At the end of the season, Julia decides to get a paternity test done on Matt.

Season Two
Julia's narcissistic mother, Erica Noughton, comes to Miami and proceeds to degrade her and make her feel worthless for not becoming a doctor. Their already fragile relationship is made even worse when Erica sleeps with Christian. Meanwhile, Julia finds that she can only orgasm with Sean when thinking about Christian. After Christian loses baby Wilber in the custody battle, Julia reveals to him that he already has a son named Matt. Thanks to life coach Ava Moore, Matt soon discovers the truth as well. When Julia reveals the truth to Sean, he pushes Julia against the freezer and throws her out of the house. Moving into a small apartment which Erica unsurprisingly mocks, Julia self-destructs, gets a boob job and starts to drink heavily. One drinking binge results in an accident where she falls through a glass door. While undergoing surgery to repair her face and remove her implants, Julia is guided through an alternate universe by Ava, where she sees what her life would be like if she married Christian. While she is a rich, successful plastic surgeon, she is also a cocaine addict, unable to have children and unfulfilled by Christian (who, without the good influence of Sean, is much more self-absorbed and amoral); an attempt to seduce a happily married Sean also goes awry. Coming out of her dream, Julia admits that she is never satisfied with what she has, always wondering how life would be on the other side. However, she realizes that she would be considerably more unhappy with Christian than with Sean. Despite remaining problems between her and Sean, they reconnect when Julia requires saving after being attacked by a kinky blind date, and later team up in an effort to protect Matt from his potentially dangerous lover, Ava.

Season Three
Still single, Julia has decided to resort to sleeping with Jude. She also asks Sean for a divorce. In an effort to bring some purpose to her life, Julia teams up with Gina Russo to create and develop De La Mer, a luxury spa. She also poaches anesthesiologist Liz Cruz from McNamara/Troy, and the three of them create a signature face cream made of semen which they market to Joan Rivers. While running the spa, Julia is romanced by Sean and Christian's new colleague, bisexual doctor, Quentin Costa, who goes to work for her. After discovering his affair with a male soldier, Julia dumps and fires him. After a tumultuous argument with her mother, Julia is shocked to discover that the plane Erica was supposed to board has crashed just after take-off. Julia joins Sean and Christian in helping the many injured victims, and finds a horrifically burned woman; who she believes is her mother. Putting her out of her misery, Julia suffocates the woman, later confessing to Sean that she feels free. Returning home, Julia is shocked to discover that her mother is waiting for her, claiming that she delayed her flight; due to their argument. Soon after, Julia discovers that she is pregnant with Sean's child; the result of a brief sexual encounter earlier in the year. A terrifying nightmare provokes Julia into getting her unborn baby checked for any deformities.

Season Four
Julia reveals to Sean that their unborn child is suffering from ectrodactyly, a congenital malformation of the hands. The baby, named Conor, is born but the decision on whether he should undergo plastic surgery creates friction between them. Finding herself yet again dissatisfied with her life despite renewing her wedding vows with Sean, Julia starts an affair with Conor's dwarf nanny Marlowe Sawyer. As she falls deeper in love with Marlowe, she plans to leave for Florence with him, Annie and Conor. However, Julia eventually decides against this, instead leaving Marlowe to live with her mother in New York City, taking Annie and Connor.

Season Five
Julia visits Los Angeles and reveals to Sean and Christian that she is in a relationship with a woman, Olivia Lord. Olivia encourages Julia to sleep with Christian one last time to "get him out of her system", which she does. After Annie bonds with Olivia's teenage daughter, Eden and expresses a desire to go to school with her, Julia permanently moves to the city. Annie and Eden's friendship; results in Sean and Julia clashing over Eden's dangerous influence; which results in Annie performing sexual acts on a classmate and worrying about her body image. Julia initially ignores Sean's worry, after Olivia blames Sean's profession for making Annie act out. After a violent encounter with a carjacker, Julia purchases a gun and initiates an affair with Christian. She also threatens Eden after discovering her relationship with Sean. Enraged, Eden begins poisoning Julia with mercury-laced fruitcake. Julia's mystery illness tears apart her affair with Christian and Julia finally realizes that she was not in love with him, but instead in love with a fantasy of him. Olivia returns to Los Angeles and helps Julia discover that she has mercury poisoning. Julia works out that she had been poisoned through eating the fruitcake and confronts Eden. In desperation Eden uses Julia's gun to shoot her in the head. Julia is rushed to hospital where she is diagnosed with having retrograde amnesia. Visiting her bedside, Sean tells her that he is her husband, and that their family has never been happier. Four months later, Julia has been made aware of Sean's lie and is slowly regaining her memory yet cannot remember the night of her shooting. Julia's relationship with Olivia is ended when Olivia dies on the operating table, having failed to tell Sean and Christian that she was secretly using prescription medication. Olivia is cremated. Eden tells Julia that Olivia had been taking anti-depressants; due to accidentally shooting Julia in a drunken rage, believing her to be an intruder. Julia believes Eden's story, though Eden throws Olivia's ashes in her face. Despite Olivia's death, Julia continues to live in New York with Annie and Conor.

Season Six
Julia returns to Los Angeles when Matt is arrested for a series of robberies. Soon after, Julia's mother, Erica arrives and announces that she is petitioning for custody of Annie and Conor, believing that Sean and Julia are not capable parents. During this time, Julia and Sean sleep together, but their romantic reunion is short-lived. But simultaneously, Sean proposes a plan to frame Erica's new husband, Renaldo for cocaine possession. Julia vetoes the idea. Later, Erica gives up on her decision to seek custody of her grandchildren after accidentally endangering Annie's welfare. As Erica prepares to leave, Julia plants the cocaine originally intended for Renaldo on her mother and Erica is arrested by police while boarding the plane to leave Los Angeles. Following her mother's arrest, Julia returns to New York with Annie and Conor.

Julia arrives in Los Angeles in preparation for Matt's wedding, and immediately reveals to Sean and Christian that she is engaged to a wealthy older man, named Edmond; who resides in London, thus; she is planning on moving to the country with Annie and Conor, angering Sean. Later, Christian makes a move on Julia while they're at a bar, but Julia stops him from going any further. She explains that while she fantasized about him repeatedly when she was with Sean, there is no longer any electricity between them. Soon after, Julia rejects a similar advance from Sean, even after he suggests they both move to New York and start afresh as a family once again. Eventually, Sean gives his legal permission to Julia to leave the country with their kids. Before leaving, Julia confides in Christian that she is worried about Sean, especially as she knows that he isn't happy working at McNamara/Troy and is in denial about his true feelings. Julia tells Sean and Christian that it will feel like a day hasn't gone by when they all meet up again, and leaves for London with her kids.

Reduction in appearances
By 2010, Julia's role in the series had greatly diminished compared to the importance of her character when the show first began; as a result of actress Joely Richardson's contracts with the series. In 2006, mid-way through the filming of the series' fourth season, Richardson announced that she wished to leave the series for an indefinite period of time to take care of her then ailing daughter. FX agreed to accommodate the request, and Julia was written out. In 2007, and with her daughter's health improved, Richardson renegotiated her contract with the series, agreeing to appear in 13 of the 22-episode fifth season. In fall 2008, further contract negotiations occurred, with Richardson agreeing to appear in 5 of the 19-episode sixth season, completing filming in June 2009.

References

McNamara, Julia
McNamara, Julia
Television characters introduced in 2003
Fictional murderers
American female characters in television

sv:Nip/Tuck#Julia McNamara